The discography of The Birthday Massacre consists of nine studio albums, one live album, two video albums, three extended plays, one single and eight music videos.

The band's debut studio album, Nothing and Nowhere, was independently recorded and distributed on May 31, 2002 on the band's official website, but was re-released on CD again with new sleeve art in 2004 and re-released again on June 5, 2007 via Metropolis Records. It was recorded and mixed by J. Aslan and Rainbow with album artwork by Jurgen Elas and Simon Bondar. The album contains songs from previous Imagica demos, which would follow a long tradition of the band remixing new versions of old songs.

The Birthday Massacre followed up Nothing and Nowhere with a second studio album, titled Violet. It was originally released as an EP on October 25, 2004 and re-released in 2005 as an LP with some added tracks from the debut. The album was mixed by Rainbow, J. Aslan, M. Falcore, George Seara, mastered by Noah Nimitz, and engineered by Brett Carruthers. Walking with Strangers was released as the band's third studio album on September 21, 2007. It was produced and engineered by Dave Ogilvie. The album debuted at number thirty-two on the Billboard Independent Albums chart. "Red Stars" was released as the album's lead single on August 21, 2007.

Looking Glass was released as an EP on May 6, 2008, containing a music video of the Dan Ouellette-directed video for the title track. The EP peaked at number twenty-four on the Billboard Dance/Electronic Albums chart. The Birthday Massacre released Pins and Needles on September 14, 2010. It became their first album to chart on the Billboard 200. It also debuted and peaked at number ninety-six in Germany. The band later released an EP, Imaginary Monsters. The EP includes a music video directed by M. Falcore and Rue Morgue. A fifth studio album, Hide and Seek, followed in 2012, debuting and peaking at number one hundred and thirty-eight on the Billboard 200 and number ninety-four in Germany. In April 2013, a video for "One Promise" directed by Michelle Hung Tsz Ching was selected among over one hundred and fifty entries as an official music video for Hide and Seek. The band's sixth album Superstition was released on November 11, 2014. The band's seventh album Under Your Spell was released on June 13, 2017. The band's eighth album "Diamonds" was released March 27, 2020. The band's ninth album Fascination was released on February 18, 2022.

Albums

Studio albums

Compilation albums

Live albums

Demo albums

Video albums

Extended plays

Singles

Music videos

Notes
 "Nevermind" is a live performance music video.
 "One Promise" was the chosen winner of a music video fan-submission contest held for the "Hide and Seek" album.
 "Superstition" was filmed in the band's rehearsal space, directed by M. Falcore's sister, Shannon.

Other appearances

Remixes

Notes
 "Last Daze" was covered and remixed by The Birthday Massacre with new vocals by Chibi and additional guitars by Rainbow and Falcore.

Features/Collaborations

Notes
 "All For You" is a collaboration of Dean Garcia, Chibi and Rainbow.
 The Albert Vorne remix of "Until The End" exclusively features only Chibi's vocals for the entire track.

References

External links
 Official website
 The Birthday Massacre at AllMusic
 

Discographies of Canadian artists